Superego (stylised as SUPEREGO) is a collective of producers, rappers singers and multi-instrumentalist artist out of Fremantle, Western Australia, previously known as POW! Negro from 2015 until 2018.

History

2015–2018: POW! Negro 
POW! Negro formed late in 2015.
 
In August 2016, the band won The Big Splash competition. Their debut single "Hidle Ho" was released in November 2016 and launched in Mojos Bar in Fremantle.
 
In January 2017, the band opened the Southbound Festival. Bob Gordon from Music Feeds said "This hip hop/jazz/metal/pop outfit [commenced] with a mix of in-your-face angst and delicious, delectable hip hop grooves. Frontman/MC, Nelson Mondlane, comes at the audience with both angst and open-embrace and it was a sight that enthralled, unnerved and enticed the uninitiated on hand as they witnessed possibly their new favourite band."
 
POW! Negro released their debut EP Jasmine & Licorice in July 2017.
 
The band supported Midnight Oil, Sampa The Great and Remi.

2018–present: Superego & Nautilus
In July 2018, the band announced they had changed their name to Superego. In a statement, the group said they "have grown more than [they] ever thought [they] could have" adding "the next steps for the group will be as SUPEREGO. As a culturally and musically diverse group, we wanted a name that was representative and reflective of everyone and feel this new identity encapsulates us as a whole."

Superego released the EP Nautilus in March 2020.

Band members
Toby Batchelor – Bass and Vox
Lachlan Dymond – Guitar, Sampling & MC
Rhys Hussey – Guitar, Drums & Vox
Kaprou Lea – Sax,
Nelson Mondlane – MC

Past Members
Luke Smoker - Drums (2015 - 2016)
Patrick McCarthy - Guitar & MC (2015 - 2016)
Chris Young – Guitar & Synth (2017 - 2019)

Discography

Extended plays

Singles

As lead artist

As featured artist

Awards and nominations

National Live Music Awards
The National Live Music Awards (NLMAs) are a broad recognition of Australia's diverse live industry, celebrating the success of the Australian live scene. The awards commenced in 2016.

|-
| 2017
| POW! Negro
| Western Australia Live Voice of the Year
|

WAM Song of the Year
The WAM Song of the Year was formed by the  Western Australian Rock Music Industry Association Inc. (WARMIA) in 1985, with its main aim to develop and run annual awards recognising achievements within the music industry in Western Australia.

 (wins only)
|-
| 2020
|  "Bad Like Ri Ri" (Adrian Dzvuke featuring POW! Negro)
| Urban / Hip hop Song of the Year
| 
|-

West Australian Music Industry Awards
The West Australian Music Industry Awards (WAMIs) are annual awards presented to the local contemporary music industry, put on annually by the Western Australian Music Industry Association Inc (WAM). The group has won five awards.
 
 (wins only)
|-
| rowspan="2"| 2016
| POW! Negro
| Most Popular New Act
| 
|-
| POW! Negro
| Most Popular Urban Act
| 
|-
| rowspan="2"| 2017
| POW! Negro
| Most Popular Live Act
| 
|-
| POW! Negro
| Most Popular Urban Act
| 
|-
| 2019
| Superego
| Best Urban Act
| 
|}

References

Musical groups established in 2015
Australian hip hop groups
2015 establishments in Australia